Tuy (or Tui) is one of the 45 provinces of Burkina Faso, located in its Hauts-Bassins Region. Its capital is Houndé.

Economy
Burkina Manganèse SARL currently holds a ten-year renewable mining permit to extract manganese from the Kiéré mine where it expects to commence production during October.

Departments
Tuy is divided into 6 departments:

See also
Regions of Burkina Faso
Provinces of Burkina Faso
Departments of Burkina Faso

References

 
Provinces of Burkina Faso